Luzifer is a German restaurant chain at seven locations in northern Germany.

Since the founding of the first Luzifer in 1999, its food service concept has been based on all-day menus for all ages.

All restaurants have a uniform interior design with the same colors and dark wood furniture and use large open dining rooms and open kitchens. All restaurants offer a weekly changing lunch menu and theme buffets and seasonal foods. All meals are prepared in front of diners in the open kitchens. Home-made products like roasted coffee, cakes and waffles are used to strengthen the brand loyalty of Luzifer customers. Locations are chosen as close to the sea as possible. The restaurant in Hamburg is, exceptionally, located in a shopping center, because of the high frequency of walk-in customers. Also important are many outdoor seats.

Locations 
 Sylt (since 1999)
 Kiel (since 2002)
 Hamburg (since 2004)
 Lübeck-Travemünde (since 2005)
 Eckernförde (since 2008)
 Schleswig (since 2010)
 Butjadingen (since 2010)

References

External links 
 Luzifer website
 Restaurant uniforms
 Chef designs

Regional restaurant chains
Restaurants in Germany